The EMI Archive Trust is a charity which was established in 1996 to hold and maintain the archives of the EMI company and its parent companies such as the Gramophone Company.  The archives are located in Hayes, where EMI had its main factories, and contain many antique recordings.

References

1996 establishments in England
Archives in London
EMI
Sound archives in the United Kingdom